The División de Honor 2013–14 is the 51st  season of the top flight of the Spanish domestic field hockey competitions since its inception in 1958. It began in autumn 2013. The defending champions are R.C. Polo, while R.C. Jolaseta and Sardinero are the teams promoted from División de Honor B.

R.C. Polo won its second title in a row (12th in total) by defeating Club Egara 1–1 (4–3 p.s.) in the Championship Final.

Competition

Format
Competition format changes for 2013–14 season. The competition it divides in three stages; regular season, 2nd stage and playoffs. Regular season comprises 11 matchdays played from October to March through a one-leg format. When regular season finish, table splits into two groups of 6 teams each; in Group 1, top four teams qualify for final stage, while in the Group B, bottom three teams are relegated to División de Honor B. Points during regular season/2nd stage are awarded as follows:

2 points for a win
1 point for a draw

Teams

Standings

Regular season

Source: Real Federación Española de Hockey

2nd stage

Championship group
In the 2nd stage, teams advance with points obtained in regular season against the same group teams.

Relegation group
In the 2nd stage, teams advance with points obtained in regular season against the same group teams.

Final stage

Semifinals

Final

Relegation playoff

|}

1st leg

2nd leg

Taburiente ACE G.C. won 5–4 on aggregate and remained in División de Honor for 2014–15 season.

Top goalscorers 

Regular season/2nd stage only.

See also
División de Honor Femenina de Hockey Hierba 2013–14

References

External links
Official site

División de Honor de Hockey Hierba
Spain
field hockey
field hockey